Kerry Saunders (born 6 December 1960) is an Australian former cricketer. She played for the Victorian state women's cricket team between 1983 and 1994. Saunders played thirteen One Day Internationals for the Australia national women's cricket team.

References

External links
 Kerry Saunders at southernstars.org.au

Living people
1960 births
Australia women One Day International cricketers
Victoria women cricketers